Chopi, also spelled Copi, Tschopi, and Txopi, is a Bantu language spoken along the southern coast of Mozambique.

Maho (2009) lists the possibly extinct Lenge dialect as a distinct language.

References

 
Southern Bantu languages
Languages of Mozambique